Motown Two is the seventh studio album by American singer-songwriter Michael McDonald. The album was released on October 26, 2004, by Universal Music International and Motown.

Track listing

Personnel

 Michael McDonald – lead and backing vocals, acoustic piano, arrangements 
 Toby Baker – keyboards, programming, arrangements 
 Tim Carmon – acoustic piano, Wurlitzer electric piano, synthesizers, organ
 Tony Swain – clavinet, synthesizers
 Billy Preston – Hammond organ
 Simon Climie – arrangements, programming, acoustic guitar, electric guitar, backing vocals 
 Bernie Chiaravalle – nylon guitar
 Michael Thompson – guitar 
 Abraham Laboriel – bass, acoustic guitar 
 Nathan East – bass
 Vinnie Colaiuta – drums
 Abe Laboriel Jr. – drums
 Nicky Shaw – drums, percussion, programming, beats, arrangements 
 Lenny Castro – percussion 
 Stevie Wonder – harmonica (2)
 Fred Vigdor – alto saxophone 
 Nick Ingman – string arrangements
 Gavyn Wright – orchestra leader
 Isobel Griffiths – orchestra contractor 
 The London Session Orchestra – strings
 Toni Braxton – lead and backing  vocals (4)
 Tamar Braxton – backing vocals
 Kendra Carr – backing vocals
 Steve Crawford – backing vocals
 Darwin Hobbs – backing vocals
 Mitchell John – backing vocals
 Lawrence Johnson – backing vocals
 Sherie Kibble – backing vocals
 Jay Malcomb – backing vocals
 Audrey Martells – backing vocals
 Kimberly Mont – backing vocals
 Racheal Oteh – backing vocals
 Shandra Penix – backing vocals
 Yvette Preyer – backing vocals
 Tiffany Ransom – backing vocals
 Drea Rheneé – backing vocals
 Kevin Whalum – backing vocals
 Sharon White – backing vocals

Production 
 Producer – Simon Climie 
 Executive Producer – Tony Swain
 Production Coordinator – Lisa Patton and Debbie Johnson
 Engineers – Simon Climie, Alan Douglas, Shannon Forrest, Don Murray, Allen Sides and Grady Walker.
 Assistant Engineers – Greg Burns, Tim Olmstead and Brian Vibbert.
 ProTools Engineering – Simon Climie, Joel Everden and Jonathan Shakovskoy.
 Mixed by Mick Guzauski at Barking Doctor Recording (Mount Kisco, NY), assisted by Tom Bender.
 Mastered by Bob Ludwig at Gateway Mastering (Portland, ME).
 Album Coordinator – Dee Harrington

Charts

References

2004 albums
Michael McDonald (musician) albums
Motown cover albums